Athletics are an American post-rock band from Asbury Park, New Jersey.

History
Athletics began in 2010, releasing their first album, Why Aren't I Home?, on Deep Elm Records. In 2012, Athletics self-released their second full-length album titled Who You Are Is Not Enough. The album was mixed by Moving Mountains Gregory Dunn. The band was featured in Alternative Press's 2015 list of "100 Bands You Need To Know". In 2016, Athletics released an EP titled When To Run, Where To Hide.

Discography
Studio albums
Why Aren't I Home (2010, Deep Elm)
Who You Are Is Not Enough (2012, self-released)
EPs
Stop Torturing Yourself (2012, Deep Elm)
When To Run, Where To Hide (2016, Deep Elm)

References

Musical groups from New Jersey
Musical groups established in 2010
2010 establishments in New Jersey
American post-rock groups